The 14th (Light) Division was an infantry division of the British Army, one of the Kitchener's Army divisions raised from volunteers by Lord Kitchener during the First World War. All of its infantry regiments were originally of the fast marching rifle or light infantry regiments, hence the title "Light". It fought on the Western Front for the duration of the First World War.
The division was disbanded by March 1919, and was not reformed in the Second World War.

Order of battle
The division comprised the following infantry brigades, which underwent major changes between February 1918 (the Army's brigade reorganisation from 4 to 3 infantry battalions) and June 1918 (rebuilt after the losses of the German spring offensive).

41st Brigade
Before June 1918
7th Battalion, The King's Royal Rifle Corps (left February 1918)
8th Battalion, The King's Royal Rifle Corps
7th Battalion, The Rifle Brigade (Prince Consort's Own)
8th Battalion, The Rifle Brigade (Prince Consort's Own)
41st Machine Gun Company (joined February 1916, left to move into 14th MG Battalion March 1918)
41st Trench Mortar Battery (joined May 1916)
After June 1918
18th Battalion, The York and Lancaster Regiment
29th Battalion, The Durham Light Infantry
33rd Battalion, The London Regiment (Rifle Brigade)
41st Trench Mortar Battery
 42nd Brigade 
Before June 1918
5th Battalion, The Oxford and Buckinghamshire Light Infantry
5th Battalion, The King's (Shropshire Light Infantry) (disbanded February 1918)
9th Battalion, The King's Royal Rifle Corps
9th Battalion, The Rifle Brigade (Prince Consort's Own)
42nd Machine Gun Company (joined February 1916, left to move into 14th MG Battalion March 1918)
42nd Trench Mortar Battery (joined April 1916)
After June 1918
6th (Royal Wiltshire Yeomanry) Battalion, the Duke of Cornwall's Light Infantry
16th Battalion, The Manchester Regiment (1st City)
14th Battalion, Princess Louise's (Argyll and Sutherland Highlanders)
42nd Trench Mortar Battery
 43rd Brigade 
Before June 1918
6th Battalion, The Somerset Light Infantry (Prince Albert's)
6th Battalion, The Duke of Cornwall's Light Infantry (disbanded February 1918)
6th Battalion, The King's Own Yorkshire Light Infantry (disbanded February 1918)
10th Battalion, The Durham Light Infantry (disbanded February 1918)
9th Battalion, The Cameronians (Scottish Rifles) (joined February 1918, left April)
7th Battalion, The King's Royal Rifle Corps (joined February 1918)
43rd Machine Gun Company (joined February 1916, left to move into 16th MG Battalion March 1918)
43rd Trench Mortar Battery (joined April 1916)
After June 1918
12th Battalion, The Suffolk Regiment (East Anglia)
20th Battalion, The Duke of Cambridge's Own (Middlesex Regiment)
10th Battalion, The Highland Light Infantry
43rd Trench Mortar Battery

 Divisional Troops 
11th Battalion The King's Regiment (Liverpool) (pioneers) (left June 1918)
15th Battalion The Loyal Regiment (North Lancashire) (pioneers) (joined June 1918)
249th Machine Gun Company (joined July 1917, left October 1917)
224th Machine Gun Company (joined November 1917, left to move into 14th MG Battalion March 1918)
14th Battalion Machine Gun Corps (formed March 1918)
14th Divisional Train ASC (100, 101, 102 and 103 Companies)
26th Mobile Veterinary Section AVC
215th Divisional Employment Company, Labour Corps (joined June 1917)ArtilleryXLVI Brigade RFA
XLVII Brigade RFA
XLVIII Brigade RFA (left January 1917)
XLIX (Howitzer) Brigade, RFA (broken up October 1916)
V.14 Heavy Trench Mortar Battery RFA (joined July 1916, left January 1918)
X.14, Y.14 and Z.14 Medium Mortar Batteries RFA (formed March 1916; Z broken up February 1918, redistributed to X and Y)
14th Heavy Battery, Royal Garrison Artillery (left 8 June 1915)Engineers61st, 62nd and 89th Field Companies
14th Divisional Signals CompanyRoyal Army Medical Corps'''
42nd, 43rd and 44th Field Ambulances
25th Sanitary Section (left April 1917)

 Battles 
Second Battle of Ypres
Hooge (German Liquid Fire Attack) – 30 and 31 July 1915
Second Attack on Bellewaarde – 25 September 1915
Battle of the Somme
Battle of Delville Wood – August – September 1916
Battle of Flers-Courcelette – September 1916
Battle of Arras (1917)
The First Battle of the Scarpe – 9–14 April 1917
The Third Battle of the Scarpe – 3–4 May 1917
Third Battle of Ypres
The Battle of Langemark – 22–27 August 1917
The First Battle of Passchendaele October 1917
The Second Battle of Passchendaele November 1917
First Battles of the Somme 1918
The Battle of St Quentin – 23–25 March 1918
The Battle of the Avre – 4 April 1918
Hundred Days Offensive
The Battle of Ypres 1918
The advance in Flanders

 Commander 
 Major-General Thomas Morland (7 September – 17 October 1914)
 Brigadier-General Francis Alexander Fortescue (17–22 October 1914) acting Major-General General Victor Arthur Couper (22 October – 30 December 1914)
 Brigadier-General Francis Alexander Fortescue (30 December 1914 – 3 January 1915) acting''
 Major-General Victor Arthur Couper (3 January 1915 – 22 March 1918)
 Major-General Walter Howarth Greenly (22–27 March 1918)
 Major-General Sir Victor Arthur Couper (27–31 March 1918)
 Major-General Percy Cyriac Burrell Skinner (31 March 1918)

See also

 List of British divisions in World War I

References

External links 
 The British Army in the Great War: The 14th (Light) Division

Infantry divisions of the British Army in World War I
Kitchener's Army divisions
Military units and formations established in 1914
Military units and formations disestablished in 1919
1914 establishments in the United Kingdom